Mind the Malhotras is an Indian sitcom series by Dia Mirza, based on Israeli comedy La Famiglia, follows the lives of Malhotra family, who have reasons to be happy but the couple is going through mid-life crisis so they go for therapy. It is available on Amazon Prime Video from 7 June 2019. It is directed by Sahil Sangha and Ajay Bhuyan starring Mini Mathur, Cyrus Sahukar, Denzil Smith, Sushmita Mukherjee and Anandita Pagnis. The series was renewed for a second season which becomes available on 12 August 2022.

Premise
When yet another married couple within their friend circle files for divorce, Rishabh and Shefali Malhotra fear that their marriage too may just be a ticking time bomb waiting to explode. They decide to seek professional help from a therapist who dredges up the most embarrassing and bizarre moments in the Malhotras' family life ranging from the quality of their sex life, the quirks of their three kids to the antics of Rishabh’s annoying mother.

Cast and characters

Main 
 Mini Mathur as Shefali 'Shef' Malhotra (Wife)
 Cyrus Sahukar as Rishabh 'Rish' Malhotra (Husband)
 Denzil Smith as Dr. Gulfam Rastogi (Therapist)
 Sushmita Mukherjee as Seema Malhotra/Mummyji (Rishabh's mother) 
 Anandita Pagnis as Jia Malhotra (Daughter of Rishabh and Shefali)
 Nikki Sharma as Dia Malhotra (Daughter of Rishabh and Shefali)
 Jason D'souza as Yohan 'Yoyo' Malhotra (Son) 
 Rahul Verma as Zoravar 'Zoru' (House help)
 Dalip Tahil as Roshan (Seema's new boyfriend) (Season 2)
 Samir Kochhar as Rishabh Jain (Shef's ex-boyfriend) (Season 2)
 Maria Goretti as Chef Maria (Season 2)
 Neal Punmiya as Pratik
 Asheesh Kapur as Surya (Friend)  
 Parinita Seth as Vaishali (Friend)
 Shivani Singh as Radha 'Rads' (Neighbour)
 Rajat Kaul as Shyam
 Kabir Jai Bedi as Rocky (Jia's boyfriend) (Season 2)
 Poojan Chhabra as Yug (Dia's boyfriend) (Season 2)
 Micky Makhija as Bharat Gupta (Season 2)

Episodic appearances 
(Ep 2 "Mother-in-Law") 
 Simran Sharma as Aadhe Ma
 Uday Nene as Arjun
 Baldev Tehran as Badminton coach
(Ep 3 "Correctile Dysfunction")
 Brinda Parekh as Kanta Kapoor 
(Ep 4 "He Says, She Says")
 Ali Fazal as Himself
 Rajat Khatri as Badrinath
(Ep 6 "Out of Control") 
 Abhishek Mistry as Gym Manager
 Sandeep Sharma as Pandit ji
 Devansh Daswani as Rustom

Episodes

Production
In November 2018, Applause Entertainment announced comedy series Mind The Malhotras based on Israeli comedy, ‘La Famiglia’. Mini Mathur and Cyrus Sahukar were cast in lead roles supported by ensemble cast of Anandita Pagnis, Nikki Sharma, Jason D'souza, Sushmita Mukherjee and Denzil Smith. It is directed by Sahil Sangha and Ajay Bhuyan. And, co produced by Sahil Sangha and Dia Mirza of Born Free Entertainment and Sameer Nair of Applause Entertainment. Sameer Nair, CEO of Applause Entertainment in a statement said, "The premise of the series is very unique, and yet completely relatable with the modern Indian audience." Mini Mathur pitched in, “I was able to identify with the character of Shefali almost instantly.” Cyrus Sahukar stated “In today’s day and age, the very premise of a show which sees a couple that has three children, seek therapy, and recount all the embarrassing and awkward shenanigans that they get up to as a family makes for hilarious viewing.”

Promotion and release 
On 28 May official trailer was released by Amazon Prime Video India on various social media platforms.

Reception
Akhil Arora writing for the Gadgets 360 of NDTV feels, "Series is a run-of-the-mill adaptation, that doesn't ever look up, let alone aim high."

References

External links
 

2019 Indian television series debuts
Indian drama television series
Hindi-language television shows